Nontachai Sit-O (Thai: นนทชัย ศิษย์โอ) is a Thai Muay Thai fighter.

Biography and career
Nontachai started Muay Thai training at the age of 9 and immediately competed to provide financial help to his family. He joined the Sit O camp in the city of Buriram a few years later. 

After his retirement Nontachai became a trainer at the Sit-O camp he then joined Tiger Muay Thai where he coached and competed on the Phuket scene. In 2014 he joined Evolve in Singapore as a coach.

Titles and accomplishments
Lumpinee Stadium
 Lumpinee Stadium Super Bantamweight (122 lbs) Champion
 Lumpinee Stadium Fighter of the Year

Rajadamnern Stadium
 2007 Rajadamnern Stadium Middleweight (160 lbs) Champion 

Professional Boxing Association of Thailand (PAT) 
 2002 Thailand 130 lbs Champion

Muay Thai record

|-  bgcolor="#cfc"
| 2013-11-18||Win ||align=left| Malik Aliane || Bangla Stadium || Phuket, Thailand|| Decision (Unanimous)||5 ||3:00
|-
! style=background:white colspan=9 |

|-  bgcolor="#cfc"
| 2011-12-30||Win ||align=left| Thiago Teixeira || Bangla Stadium || Phuket, Thailand|| TKO (Doctor stoppage)||2 ||
|-
! style=background:white colspan=9 | 

|-  bgcolor="#cfc"
| 2011-08-10||Win ||align=left| Tony J.Prapa || Bangla Stadium || Phuket, Thailand|| KO (Knee to the body)||3 ||

|-  bgcolor="#fbb"
| 2008-02-04 || Loss ||align=left| Diesellek Rungruangyon || Daorungchujaroen, Rajadamnern Stadium || Bangkok, Thailand || Decision || 5 || 3:00

|-  bgcolor="#cfc"
| 2008-01-03||Win ||align=left| Lamsongkram Chuwattana ||Rajadamnern Stadium || Bangkok, Thailand|| Decision ||5 ||3:00

|-  bgcolor="#cfc"
| 2007-06-30 || Win ||align=left| Salahdine Ait-naceur  || Gala France-Thailande || France || Decision || 5 || 3:00

|-  bgcolor="#fbb"
| 2007-05-28 || Loss ||align=left| Naruepol Fairtex || Daorungchujaroenn, Rajadamnern Stadium || Bangkok, Thailand || Decision || 5 || 3:00

|-  bgcolor="#cfc"
| 2007-03-29||Win ||align=left| Lamsongkram Chuwattana ||Rajadamnern Stadium || Bangkok, Thailand|| Decision ||5 ||3:00
|-
! style=background:white colspan=9 | 

|-  bgcolor="#cfc"
| 2006-12-10||Win ||align=left| Big Ben Chor Rachadakon ||Rajadamnern Stadium || Bangkok, Thailand|| Decision ||5 ||3:00

|-  bgcolor="#fbb"
| 2006-07-16 || Loss ||align=left| Chaowalit Jocky Gym || Channel 7 Stadium || Bangkok, Thailand || KO || 3 || 

|-  bgcolor="#fbb"
| 2006-05-14 || Loss ||align=left| Naruepol Fairtex || Channel 7 Stadium || Bangkok, Thailand || Decision || 5 || 3:00

|-  bgcolor="#fbb"
| 2005-10-21 || Loss ||align=left| Namsaknoi Yudthagarngamtorn || Lumpinee Champion Krikkrai, Lumpinee Stadium || Bangkok, Thailand || Decision (Unanimous) || 5 || 3:00
|-
! style=background:white colspan=9 |  

|-  bgcolor="#cfc"
| 2005-09-02 || Win ||align=left| Danthai Singmanasak || Saengmorakot, Lumpinee Stadium ||  Bangkok, Thailand || Decision || 5 || 3:00

|-  bgcolor="#cfc"
| 2005-08-09 || Win ||align=left| Danthai Singmanasak|| Saengsawang, Lumpinee Stadium || Bangkok, Thailand || Decision || 5 || 3:00

|-  bgcolor="#cfc"
| 2005-01-13 || Win ||align=left| Noppadet Sengsimew Gym || Bangrachan, Rajadamnern Stadium || Bangkok, Thailand || Decision  || 5 || 3:00

|-  bgcolor="#fbb"
| 2004-09-03 || Loss ||align=left| Namsaknoi Yudthagarngamtorn || Por.Pramuk, Lumpinee Stadium || Bangkok, Thailand || Decision (Unanimous) || 5 || 3:00
|-
! style=background:white colspan=9 |   

|-  style="background:#cfc;"
| 2004-07-22 || Win ||align=left| Banpot Sor Romyanon || Phetsupapan, Rajadamnern Stadium || Bangkok, Thailand || KO || 4 || 

|-  style="background:#cfc;"
| 2004-06-01 || Win ||align=left| Khunsuk Phetsupapan || Phetsupapan, Lumpinee Stadium || Bangkok, Thailand || KO || 4 || 

|-  style="background:#cfc;"
| 2004-03-29 || Win ||align=left| Patak Sor Chulasen || Rajadamnern Stadium || Bangkok, Thailand || Decision || 5 || 3:00 

|-  bgcolor="#cfc"
| 2003-12-30 || Win ||align=left| Moussa Konaté  || Lumpinee Muay Thai Gaala|| Helsinki, Finland || Decision || 5 || 3:00

|-  bgcolor="#fbb"
| 2003-09-30 || Loss||align=left| Noppadet Sengsimew Gym || Lumpinee Stadium || Bangkok, Thailand || Decision  || 5 || 3:00

|-  bgcolor="#c5d2ea"
| 2003-08-21 || Draw||align=left| Noppadet Sengsimew Gym || Bangrachan, Lumpinee Stadium || Bangkok, Thailand || Decision  || 5 || 3:00

|- style="background:#cfc;"
| 2003-06-03 || Win ||align=left| Petchnamek Sor Siriwat|| Petchyindee, Lumpinee Stadium || Bangkok, Thailand || Decision || 5 || 3:00

|-  style="background:#fbb;"
| 2003-04-08 || Loss ||align=left| Buakaw Por.Pramuk || Lumpinee Stadium || Bangkok, Thailand || TKO || 3 || 

|- style="background:#cfc;"
| 2003-01-14 || Win ||align=left| Samkor Kiatmontep|| Petchpanomrung, Lumpinee Stadium || Bangkok, Thailand || Decision || 5 || 3:00

|-  bgcolor="#cfc"
| 2002-12-03 || Win ||align=left| Orono Majestic Gym || Lumpinee Stadium || Bangkok, Thailand || Decision || 5 || 3:00
|-
! style=background:white colspan=9 |

|-  bgcolor="#cfc"
| 2002-09-27 || Win ||align=left| Banpot Sor Romyanon || Petchyindee, Lumpinee Stadium || Bangkok, Thailand || Decision  || 5 || 3:00

|-  bgcolor="#fbb"
| 2002-08-06 || Loss ||align=left| Orono Majestic Gym || Petchyindee, Lumpinee Stadium || Bangkok, Thailand || Decision  || 5 || 3:00

|-  bgcolor="#c5d2ea"
| 2002-07-05 || Draw||align=left| Orono Majestic Gym || Petchyindee, Lumpinee Stadium || Bangkok, Thailand || Decision  || 5 || 3:00

|- style="background:#fbb;"
| 2002-04-26 || Loss ||align=left| Thongthai Por.Burapha || Lumpinee Stadium || Bangkok, Thailand || Decision || 5 || 3:00

|- style="background:#fbb;"
| 2002-03-22 || Loss ||align=left| Samkor Kiatmontep|| Petchyindee, Lumpinee Stadium || Bangkok, Thailand || Decision || 5 || 3:00
|-
! style=background:white colspan=9 |

|- style="background:#fbb;"
| 2001-12-07 || Loss ||align=left| Samkor Chor.Rathchatasupak|| Lumpinee Stadium || Bangkok, Thailand || Decision|| 5 ||3:00

|-  style="background:#cfc;"
| 2001-10-17 || Win ||align=left| Watcharachai Kaewsamrit || Daorung Chujaroen, Rajadamnern Stadium || Bangkok, Thailand || Decision || 5 || 3:00

|-  style="background:#cfc;"
| 2001-05-25 || Win ||align=left| Yodbuangam Lukbanyai || Phetsupapan, Lumpinee Stadium || Bangkok, Thailand || Decision || 5 || 3:00

|- style="background:#cfc;"
| 2001-04-10 || Win ||align=left| Yodbuangam Lukbanyai || Lumpinee Stadium || Bangkok, Thailand || Decision || 5 || 3:00

|-  style="background:#cfc;"
| 2001-03-23 || Win ||align=left| Chachanakon Por.Burapha ||  Lumpinee Stadium || Bangkok, Thailand || Decision || 5 ||3:00

|-  style="background:#cfc;"
| 2001-02-06 || Win ||align=left| Suriya Thungyaiwittayakom ||  Lumpinee Stadium || Bangkok, Thailand || Decision || 5 ||3:00

|- style="background:#c5d2ea;"
| 2001-01-06 || Draw||align=left| Ekasit Sitkriengkrai || Lumpinee Stadium || Bangkok, Thailand || Decision || 5 || 3:00

|-  style="background:#cfc;"
| 2000-12-08 || Win ||align=left| Komsaen Tor.Saengkaew ||  Lumpinee Stadium || Bangkok, Thailand || Decision || 5 ||3:00

|-  style="background:#fbb;"
| 2000-11-17 || Loss ||align=left| Sangheeran Lukbanyai ||  Lumpinee Stadium || Bangkok, Thailand || Decision ||5  ||3:00

|-  style="background:#cfc;"
| 2000-10-27 || Win ||align=left| Srisomdet Lukjaopomaesak ||  Lumpinee Stadium || Bangkok, Thailand || Decision || 5 ||3:00

|-  style="background:#cfc;"
| 2000-10-01 || Win ||align=left| Surachai Sakjawee||  Channel 7 Stadium || Bangkok, Thailand || Decision || 5 ||3:00

|-  style="background:#fbb;"
| 2000-09-19 || Loss ||align=left| Pornsiri Luksirichai ||  Lumpinee Stadium || Bangkok, Thailand || Decision ||5  ||3:00
|-
! style=background:white colspan=9 |

|-  style="background:#cfc;"
| 2000-08-29 || Win ||align=left| Nuapathapee Chengsiew Gym||  Lumpinee Stadium || Bangkok, Thailand || Decision || 5 ||3:00

|-  style="background:#cfc;"
| 2000-05-23 || Win ||align=left| Denchai Lukbanyai||  Lumpinee Stadium || Bangkok, Thailand || Decision || 5 ||3:00

|-  style="background:#fbb;"
| 2000-04-11 || Loss ||align=left| Chalermpon Kiatsunata||  Lumpinee Stadium || Bangkok, Thailand || Decision || 5 ||3:00

|-  style="background:#fbb;"
| ? || Loss ||align=left| Sangheeran Lukbanyai ||  Lumpinee Stadium || Bangkok, Thailand || Decision ||5  ||3:00
|-
! style=background:white colspan=9 |

|-
| colspan=9 | Legend:

See also 
List of male kickboxers

References

1984 births
Living people
Nontachai Sit-O
Nontachai Sit-O